Siempurgo (also spelled Sienpurgo) is a town in northern Ivory Coast. It is a sub-prefecture of Boundiali Department in Bagoué Region, Savanes District.

Siempurgo was a commune until March 2012, when it became one of 1126 communes nationwide that were abolished.

In 2014, the population of the sub-prefecture of Siempurgo was 16,682.

Villages
The 18 villages of the sub-prefecture of Siempurgo and their population in 2014 are:

Notes

Sub-prefectures of Bagoué
Former communes of Ivory Coast